Anancylus mindanaonis is a species of beetle in the family Cerambycidae. It was described by Stephan von Breuning in 1968. It is known from the Philippines.

References

Mesosini
Beetles described in 1968